The 2016  Grand Prix SAR La Princesse Lalla Meryem was a women's professional tennis tournament played on clay courts. It was the 16th edition of the tournament and part of the WTA International tournaments category of the 2016 WTA Tour. It took place in Rabat, Morocco, between 25 and 30 April 2016.

Point distribution

Singles main draw entrants

Seeds 

 1 Rankings as of April 18, 2016

Other entrants 
The following players received wildcards into the singles main draw:
  Ghita Benhadi
  Anna Blinkova
  Ons Jabeur

The following players received entry as qualifiers:
  Marina Erakovic
  Kaia Kanepi
  Aleksandra Krunić
  Sílvia Soler Espinosa

The following player received entry as a special exempt:
  Kateryna Kozlova

The following player entered by a protected ranking:
  Laura Robson

The following players received entry as lucky losers:
  Richèl Hogenkamp
  Anastasia Rodionova
  Sara Sorribes Tormo

Withdrawals 
Before the tournament
  Kateryna Bondarenko → replaced by  Andreea Mitu
  Çağla Büyükakçay → replaced by  Anastasia Rodionova
  Misaki Doi → replaced by  Alison Riske
  Irina Falconi → replaced by  Anastasija Sevastova
  Nao Hibino → replaced by  Kiki Bertens
  Bojana Jovanovski → replaced by  Alexandra Dulgheru
  Karin Knapp → replaced by  Richèl Hogenkamp
  Johanna Konta → replaced by  Tatjana Maria
  Laura Siegemund → replaced by  Sara Sorribes Tormo
  Elena Vesnina → replaced by  Donna Vekić

Retirements 
  Lesia Tsurenko

Doubles main draw entrants

Seeds 

 1 Rankings as of April 18, 2016

Other entrants 
The following pairs received wildcards into the doubles main draw:
  Ghita Benhadi /  Ons Jabeur
  Salma Charif /  Abir El Fahimi

Withdrawals
During the tournament
  Daniela Hantuchová

Champions

Singles 

  Timea Bacsinszky def.  Marina Erakovic, 6–2, 6–1

Doubles 

  Xenia Knoll /  Aleksandra Krunić def.  Tatjana Maria /  Raluca Olaru 6–3, 6–0.

References

External links 
 Official website

Morocco Open
Grand Prix SAR La Princesse Lalla Meryem
Morocco